501 Squadron or 501st Squadron may refer to:

 No. 501 Squadron RAF, United Kingdom
 501 Squadron (Portugal)
 501 Squadron, Air Force Mobile Deployment Wing SAAF, South Africa
 501st Tactical Reconnaissance Squadron (JASDF), Japan
 501st Aero Squadron, Air Service, United States Army, see list of American aero squadrons
 501st Bombardment Squadron, United States Air Force
 VMFAT-501, United States Marine Corps